Michael Devoe (born December 17, 1999) is an American professional basketball player for the Ontario Clippers of the NBA G League. He played college basketball for the Georgia Tech Yellow Jackets of the Atlantic Coast Conference (ACC).

Early life and high school career
Devoe began playing competitive basketball at age nine. For three years, he played for Oak Ridge High School in Orlando, Florida. As a junior, Devoe averaged 22.4 points, 6.9 rebounds and 4.8 assists per game. For his senior season, he transferred to Montverde Academy in Montverde, Florida. He was teammates with RJ Barrett, Filip Petrušev and Andrew Nembhard. Devoe helped Montverde achieve a 35–0 record and win the High School Nationals title. A consensus four-star recruit, he committed to playing college basketball for Georgia Tech over offers from USC and Wake Forest.

College career
As a freshman at Georgia Tech, Devoe averaged 9.7 points per game. On November 20, 2019, he recorded a season-high 34 points and nine rebounds in an 82–78 loss to Georgia. Devoe averaged 16 points, 3.9 rebounds and 3.4 assists per game in his sophomore season, earning All-Atlantic Coast Conference (ACC) honorable mention. On February 20, 2021, he scored a junior season-high 29 points, shooting 7-of-11 from three-point range, in an 87–60 win over Miami (Florida). He was named ACC tournament MVP after leading Georgia Tech to its first title since 1993. As a junior, Devoe averaged 15 points, 4.3 rebounds and 3.3 assists per game, repeating on the All-ACC honorable mention. After the season, he declared for the 2021 NBA draft while maintaining his college eligibility, but ultimately returned to Georgia Tech. On November 20, 2021, Devoe scored a career-high 37 points in a 88–78 win over Georgia. He was named to the Third Team All-ACC as a senior.

Professional career

Ontario Clippers (2022–present)
On October 24, 2022, Devoe joined the Ontario Clippers training camp roster.

Career statistics

College

|-
| style="text-align:left;"| 2018–19
| style="text-align:left;"| Georgia Tech
| 32 || 23 || 32.2 || .401 || .393 || .710 || 3.3 || 2.5 || 1.4 || .5 || 9.7
|-
| style="text-align:left;"| 2019–20
| style="text-align:left;"| Georgia Tech
| 28 || 28 || 35.1 || .476 || .427 || .750 || 3.9 || 3.4 || 1.2 || .1 || 16.0
|-
| style="text-align:left;"| 2020–21
| style="text-align:left;"| Georgia Tech
| 26 || 26 || 35.0 || .455 || .400 || .753 || 4.3 || 3.3 || 1.3 || .3 || 15.0
|-
| style="text-align:left;"| 2021–22
| style="text-align:left;"| Georgia Tech
| 31 || 29 || 34.5 || .462 || .365 || .733 || 4.9 || 3.1 || 1.4 || .4 || 17.9
|- class="sortbottom"
| style="text-align:center;" colspan="2"| Career
| 117 || 106 || 34.1 || .452 || .407 || .738 || 3.6 || 3.1 || 1.3 || .3 || 14.6

References

External links
Georgia Tech Yellow Jackets bio

1999 births
Living people
American men's basketball players
Basketball players from Orlando, Florida
Georgia Tech Yellow Jackets men's basketball players
Montverde Academy alumni
Shooting guards